Omar Al-Amadi (Arabic: عمر العمادي) (born 5 April 1995) is a Qatari footballer who plays for Qatar SC as a midfielder.

External links
 

Qatari footballers
1995 births
Living people
Qatar Stars League players
Al-Arabi SC (Qatar) players
Qatar SC players
Association football midfielders